Brett Derrell Maxie (born January 13, 1962) is an American football coach and former player who is a defensive backs coach of the National Football League (NFL).  He was a defensive back for 13 seasons for the NFL's New Orleans Saints, Atlanta Falcons, Carolina Panthers, and San Francisco 49ers. He spent the 2007 NFL season as a defensive assistant with the Miami Dolphins. On February 11, 2008 Maxie was named the assistant defensive coach with the Dallas Cowboys under Dave Campo. Maxie played college football at Texas Southern University.

References

1962 births
Living people
American football safeties
Atlanta Falcons coaches
Atlanta Falcons players
Carolina Panthers coaches
Carolina Panthers players
Colorado Buffaloes football coaches
Dallas Cowboys coaches
Miami Dolphins coaches
New Orleans Saints players
San Francisco 49ers coaches
San Francisco 49ers players
Tampa Bay Buccaneers coaches
Tennessee Titans coaches
Texas Southern Tigers football players
Vanderbilt Commodores football coaches
Sportspeople from Dallas
Players of American football from Dallas
Ed Block Courage Award recipients
Houston Gamblers (2022) coaches